Rumilly is a commune in the Haute-Savoie department in the Auvergne-Rhône-Alpes region in south-eastern France. In 2019, the commune had a population of 15,768.

Geography
The Chéran forms part of the commune's eastern border, crosses the village, flows north-northwestward through the northern part of the commune, then flows into the Fier, which forms part of its northern border. Rumilly forms an urban unit with the adjacent, smaller commune Sales.

Climate 

Rumilly has an oceanic climate (Köppen Cfb) in spite of its relatively far inland position. Influenced by its elevation, summers are rather moderate on average, although they can be highly variable with extreme heat spikes. Winters see occasional freezing temperatures, but most often stays in the single-digits during daytime with frequent cold rain. Air frosts are normal during the night and snowfall is not uncommon.

Population

Politics
Christian Heison is the current mayor of Rumilly, elected in 2020.

History

The communes' football club Rumilly-Vallières made it to the semi-finals of the 2020–21 Coupe de France for the first time in their history after beating Toulouse 2-0, whilst playing in the Championnat National 2, the fourth tier of the French football league system. The victory was described as the "greatest feat" in Rumilly-Vallières's history by L'Équipe. They exited the competition after a 5-1 defeat to Ligue 1 side Monaco.

Twinning
Rumilly is twinned with Michelstadt, Germany and Maglie, Italy

Communes of the Haute-Savoie department
 Football Club Sportif Rumilly

References

Communes of Haute-Savoie